Multi 23 is a trimaran designed by VPLP and manufactured by Torpen International Boats in Qingdao, Shandong province, China.

See also
List of multihulls
Torpen International Boats
VPLP

References

Trimarans
2000s sailboat type designs